Guigou is a surname, and may refer to:
 Élisabeth Guigou (born 1946), French politician
 Gianni Guigou (born 1975), Uruguayan footballer
 Michaël Guigou (born 1982), French handball player
 Paul Guigou (1834–1871), French painter

Guigou may also refer to:

Guigou, Morocco